Harrison James Holgate (born 1 July 2000) is an English professional footballer who plays as a defender for EFL League One club Fleetwood Town.

Career
Born in Leeds, Holgate began his career as part of the Manchester United youth academy before being released at U14. He then joined the Middlesbrough youth academy but injury curtailed his U16 involvement which inevitably led to his release. He then joined the Fleetwood Town youth academy on a two year scholarship where in his second year, still only 17, he signed on 10th Feb 2018 a youth loan to Stalybridge Celtic, making 15 appearances, which led to Holgate signing a professional contract with Fleetwood Town on 4 May 2018. A couple months later, on 6 September, Holgate joined Northern Premier League side Stafford Rangers on a youth loan playing nine games, with Fleetwood Town recalling him on 8 October. On 13 October, he signed with National League North side Ashton United. He made his competitive debut for the club that same day against Spennymoor Town, starting the match in a 5–0 defeat.
32252.

After being with Ashton Town for a month, Holgate returned to Fleetwood Town and was an unused substitute for the club's EFL Trophy match against Bury on 13 November. Holgate then made his first-team debut for the club on 25 September 2019 against Liverpool U23 in the EFL Trophy. He started and played the first half before being substituted at half-time as Fleetwood Town would advance through penalties.

The next season, Holgate started in Fleetwood Town's opening EFL Trophy match against Carlisle United. He made his full EFL League 1 debut against Hull City on 9th October, playing the full match in a 4-1 victory.

On 18 December 2020, Holgate joined National League side Altrincham on a youth loan. On 16 January 2021, Holgate was recalled from the loan by Fleetwood Town.

Career statistics

References

External links
Profile at the Fleetwood Town website

2000 births
Living people
Footballers from Leeds
English footballers
Association football defenders
Fleetwood Town F.C. players
Stalybridge Celtic F.C. players
Stafford Rangers F.C. players
Ashton United F.C. players
Altrincham F.C. players
English Football League players
National League (English football) players
Northern Premier League players